Sonargaon Janapath Road is a road that joins House Building with Ashulia embankment situated in Uttara, Dhaka. It is a four-lane road.

This road passes between Sectors 8, 9, 11, 13 and 12 and merges with Mirpur Road in the west.

In 2019, the Dhaka North City Corporation authority conducted an official eviction drive on the road.

Notes

References

External Link
 Sonargaon Janapath road on Google maps

Roads in Uttara
Streets in Dhaka